Loyola School, Baripada, is the only English medium, ICSE public school in Sankhabhanga in the town of Baripada in Odisha, India. It was established by the Society of Jesus in 2002. The Indian Certificate of Secondary Education exam is administered after the 10th grade.

See also

 Catholic Church in India
 List of Jesuit schools
 List of schools in Odisha

References  

Jesuit secondary schools in India
Jesuit primary schools in India
High schools and secondary schools in Odisha
Christian schools in Odisha
Mayurbhanj district
Educational institutions established in 2002
2002 establishments in Orissa